Fatmir Doga (born 1967 in Albania), began acting at the early age of five and played in more than seventy theater and television performances. His passion for arts made his teenage dreams come true when he won the competition vs hundreds of students, to enter the University of Arts of Albania in Tirana (1987–1991). These were the years that gave Fatmir the opportunity to meet the best actors of Albanian cinematography and practice his craft. With the knowledge he gained and his fiery fervor for the movie industry he dreamed about becoming a film director. After completing Academy of Fine Arts he worked in Albania and Italy. Fatmir moved to Canada in 1998 where he continued his career as an actor and director.
Successively in 2008 he started working in Los Angeles where he produced and directed several feature films that have seen starring Hollywood known actors such as Michael Madsen, Rachel Hunter, Masiela Lusha, Stacy Keach, Christopher McDonald, Sienna Guillory, Robert Miano, Lorenzo Lamas.

References

External links 

 

1967 births
American film directors
American film producers
American male film actors
American male screenwriters
American music video directors
English-language film directors
Living people